China Water Risk is a non-profit initiative based in Hong Kong dedicated to highlighting and addressing business and environmental risk arising from the country’s water crisis. Its stated aim is "to foster efficient and responsible use of water resources of the People's Republic of China by engaging the global investment and business communities, civil society and individuals in understanding and managing China’s water risk”. Its information portal www.chinawaterrisk.org provides a platform to share expert views, research, interviews and analysis from industry leaders. Users can access the most relevant and critical information to help make informed investment decisions as well as remain on top of opportunities to invest in a changing environment. China Water Risk is often quoted by business and industry news and gives talks, participate in panel discussions  and moderate in various investor and business conferences and forums.

Background

History

China Water Risk is funded by Hong Kong-based ADM Capital Foundation (US 501(c)(3) charitable status  and a registered charitable institution under Sec. 88 of the IRD in Hong Kong) ADM Capital Foundation was established in 2006 by Asia Debt Management Hong Kong Limited (ADM Capital).

The initiative developed in collaboration in its pilot stage as The Asia Water Project, with Civic Exchange, the Association for Social and Responsible Investing in Asia (ASrIA), Business for Social Responsibility (BSR), the Institute of Public and Environmental Affairs (IPE), and Responsible Research
.  It was rebranded as China Water Risk in 2010 and its portal www.chinawaterrisk.org website was open to public on October 27, 2011.

Approach

China Water Risk works with water, industrial, investment experts and NGOs, think-tanks and business/investor driven initiatives to bring up-to-date information on water in China to the public through its website.

Since the economy runs on water and water is used differently by each sector, China Water Risk adopts a sector approach to categorizing water risks. Intelligence by sector, including sector peer group benchmarking, help businesses and investors navigate and mitigate these specific risks. Sectors covered by China Water Risk are:
 Agriculture
 Power
 Food & Beverage
 Metals & Mining
 Textiles
 Electronics
The vast amount of information is made accessible by incorporative use of info-graphics and interactive web-graphics in the "Big Picture" on the website http://chinawaterrisk.org/big-picture/.

Key risks in China arising from water scarcity and pollution

Below are some key environmental and business risks that China is encountering as highlighted on the China Water Risk’s website:
 China has 20% of the world’s population but only 7% of its freshwater reserves.
 The Dry 11 of 31 regions of mainland China provinces, autonomous regions and municipalities (including Jiangsu, Shandong, Henan, Hebei, Shanxi, Beijing, Shanghai and Tianjin) have renewable resources per capita per annum below 1,000 cubic meters, a water poverty level considered by experts to pose a severe constraint on food production, economic development and protection of natural systems.
 These Dry 11 have water resources comparable to the Middle East.
 The economy runs on water - 85% of water use in China by agriculture and industry and experts project that demand for water may not be met by 2030.
 Food security - The Dry 11 regions account for RMB2.4 trillion or 40% of the total agricultural output value of China.
 Industrial disruption – The Dry 11 regions account for RMB28.7 trillion or 52% of the total industrial output value of China.
 Energy issues – 96% of power in China requires water to generate.
 Pollution exacerbates scarcity. 77% of the 26 key lakes and reservoirs and 43% of the 7 major river basins monitored are unfit for human contact. Already, 19% of rivers and basins and 35% of key lakes and reservoirs are essentially useless for both agricultural and industrial use.
 According to the World Bank, 300 million rural Chinese still lack access to safe drinking water and as water stress worsens, estimates there could be 30 million environmental fleeing water stress by 2020 in China.
 Countries such as India, Bangladesh, Laos, Thailand, Pakistan, Myanmar, Vietnam and Cambodia rely on water from China.

As a result, China Water Risk believes that "Regardless of whether we care for the environment, we have come to a point where water risks affect us all – as businesses, as investors and ultimately as individuals."

References

External links

Environmental organisations based in Hong Kong
Water scarcity